Rains Brothers Building, also known as Miner's Hardware Company and Roosevelt Hotel, was a historic commercial building located at Joplin, Jasper County, Missouri. It was built in 1900–1901, and was a three-story, three bay, two-part commercial building with Renaissance Revival style detailing. It was destroyed by fire on March 1, 2012.

It was listed on the National Register of Historic Places in 1990. It was located in the Main and Eighth Streets Historic District.

References

Individually listed contributing properties to historic districts on the National Register in Missouri
Commercial buildings on the National Register of Historic Places in Missouri
Renaissance Revival architecture in Missouri
Commercial buildings completed in 1901
Buildings and structures in Joplin, Missouri
National Register of Historic Places in Jasper County, Missouri